Das Shadow is a band created by Andrew Phillpott, who is known for co-writing with Christian Eigner and Dave Gahan from Depeche Mode. Das Shadow started as a production/remix project, remixing for Dave Gahan, Yazoo and Veto.

The first track and video "Navigate The Menus" appeared at the end of 2008, to some acclaim.

They signed their first recording contract with Zycos/Sony, with the first single "Navigate The Menus" being released on iTunes on 5 May 2009. The track was remixed by Kap10 Kurt, Filthyboy13 and Raymie Burns. The songwriting was crediting to Phillpott/Eigner.

Das Shadow will be issuing their next release on a new record label, We Collect Enemies, created by Phillpott, Daryl Bamonte and Glen Brady, better known as DJ Wool. It is a separate label to Elsbeere Recordings, which was created by Eigner, Bamonte and Florian Kraemmer.

Their second single, "Slew", was released on 22 March 2010, with the streaming of the music video on their Myspace page a few days earlier. The remixes for this single came from DJ Wool, Jaimie Fanatic and Tobias Enhus. The two singles were re-released by a new label: Music-laden

References

External links
 Official MySpace page
 Official YouTube channel
 Official Facebook page

English hip hop groups
British record producers
Remixers